Gates Corner is an unincorporated community in Beltrami County, Minnesota, United States.

Notes

Unincorporated communities in Beltrami County, Minnesota
Unincorporated communities in Minnesota